Harmatitis is a genus of moths in the family Gelechiidae. It contains only one species, Harmatitis sphecopa, which is found in Sri Lanka.

The wingspan is 17–18 mm. The forewings are dark purple-fuscous with the costal edge ochreous-orange from about one-fifth to four-fifths. There is an irregular transverse ochreous-orange spot on the costa before the middle, reaching half across the wing. There is also a narrow ochreous-orange spot along the costa about three-fourths and a group of a few pale ochreous scales above the tornus. The hindwings are dark fuscous, with golden-bronze and purplish reflections.

References

 ZipCodeZoo

Gelechiinae